The Boss Baby is a 2017 American computer-animated comedy film produced by DreamWorks Animation and distributed by 20th Century Fox. Loosely based on the 2010 picture book of the same name by Marla Frazee, it was directed by Tom McGrath from a screenplay by Michael McCullers, and stars the voices of Alec Baldwin as the title character, along with Steve Buscemi, Jimmy Kimmel, Lisa Kudrow, Miles Bakshi, and Tobey Maguire. The first installment in The Boss Baby franchise, the plot follows a boy helping his baby brother who is a secret agent in the war for adults' love between babies and puppies.

The Boss Baby premiered at the Miami International Film Festival on March 12, 2017, and was released in the United States on March 31.  The film received mixed reviews from critics upon release, who praised its animation and voice performances but criticized its plot and humor. It grossed $528 million worldwide against its $125 million budget. The film received Best Animated Feature nominations at the Academy Awards, Annie Awards, and Golden Globes, losing all three awards to Coco.

A Netflix television series, The Boss Baby: Back in Business, premiered on April 6, 2018, while a sequel film, The Boss Baby: Family Business, was released in theaters and on Peacock on July 2, 2021. Another Netflix television series, The Boss Baby: Back in the Crib, premiered on May 19, 2022.

Plot
Tim Templeton, an imaginative 7-year-old boy, relishes his parents' attention and is horrified when a new baby brother arrives. Boss Baby, whom he first saw arriving in a taxi, clad in suit and tie, and carrying a briefcase, behaves normally around the adults, crying for attention, food and diapers all day and night. However, Tim, quickly growing jealous, sees Baby behaving and talking like an adult whenever his parents are not looking.

One day, Baby holds a staff meeting with other toddlers and infants, under the guise of a neighborhood play date. Tim attempts to record them on a cassette tape, but he is spotted and chased by Baby and his cronies. The parents see this as the children playing in the yard. When Baby destroys Tim's stuffed lamb, the latter attempts to slingshot him out a window, but his parents stop him and he accidentally slingshots the tape into the street, on which a car smashes it. Tim is grounded until he learns to get along with Baby.

Later, Baby makes Tim suck a special pacifier that allows them to see Baby Corp, where babies come from. Most babies go to families, but those unresponsive to tickling are sent to management, where they are given a special baby formula that allows them to think and behave as adults while remaining young forever. Baby also explains he's on a special mission to discover why the world's love of babies is being threatened lately by love of puppies, and came to the Templetons as Tim's parents work for Puppy Co. Once his mission is done, he will leave. However, the boys overhear Baby's boss threatening to fire him if he fail. As that would mean Baby would have to stay with the Templetons and grow up, Tim and Baby agree to work together to prevent this from happening.

On Take Your Kid to Work Day, the parents take Tim and Baby with them to Puppy Co., where the boys sneak away to investigate. They are captured by Francis Francis, CEO of Puppy Co, who reveals he was previously the Boss of Baby Corp, but started to slowly grow up because he was partially intolerant to the formula. He was fired and forced to live with a hillbilly family, but saved his magic pacifier. He steals Baby's formula, intending to use it to make a "Forever Puppy" incapable of aging or dying, which will take all love from babies and give him his revenge on BabyCorp.

Francis whisks Tim's parents away to a conference in Las Vegas, and leaves his brother Eugene to watch the children in the guise of a female nanny. Without the formula, Baby starts to periodically revert to normal infant behavior. The boys, with help from the neighborhood toddlers, escape Eugene and head to Las Vegas, where they find Francis ready to send a rocket of Forever Puppies out into the world. Tim's parents suspect something is wrong when they hear their children, but are locked up underneath the rocket to be burned. Tim and Baby fight Francis on a raised walkway, pretending to be pirates; they knock him into the vat of augmented formula, where he turns back into a baby and is taken home by Eugene. Tim saves his parents, but Baby goes completely infantile and is stranded on the rocket, which is about to launch. Tim sings him a lullaby, and Baby jumps to him and is revived by the formula.

Baby is taken back to Baby Corp and promoted to CEO. Some Baby Corp employees enter Tim's house, where they remove evidence of Baby, and make his parents forget about him while they are sleeping. One of them asks Tim if he would like to forget too, but he declines. Baby and Tim miss each other terribly, and Tim finally invites Baby back, saying if there is only love enough for one of them, Baby can have it all. Realizing that love is something that grows, instead of being split, Baby returns, this time as a normal infant boy named Theodore "Ted" Templeton.

Years later, an adult Tim and Ted tell the story to Tim's eldest daughter, who is apprehensive about the arrival of her new baby sister. After the adults leave, the newborn little girl reveals she is a Boss Baby, too, surprising the elder daughter.

Cast

 Alec Baldwin as Theodore Lindsay "Ted" Templeton Jr./The Boss Baby, an infant with the mind of an adult, who works at Baby Corp and gains his intelligence and speaking ability from drinking a "Secret Baby Formula".
 Miles Bakshi as Timothy Leslie "Tim" Templeton, Boss Baby's 7-year-old brother.
 Tobey Maguire as Adult Tim, the narrator.
 Jimmy Kimmel as Theodore Lindsay "Ted" Templeton Sr., Janice's husband and Tim and Ted Jr.'s father.
 Lisa Kudrow as Janice Templeton, Ted Sr.'s wife and Tim and Ted Jr.'s mother.
 Steve Buscemi as Francis E. Francis/Super Colossal Big Fat Boss Baby, the CEO of Puppy Co, the former CEO of BabyCorp and the Boss's nemesis
 Conrad Vernon as Eugene Francis, Francis's brother and minion.
 James McGrath as Wizzie, Tim's Gandalf-esque alarm clock.
 David Soren as Jimbo
 Nina Zoe Bakshi as Tabitha Templeton, Tim's daughter.
 Tom McGrath as Julia Child (TV Chef)
 Walt Dohrn as Photographer
 James Ryan as Story Bear
 Eric Bell Jr. as The Triplets
 ViviAnn Yee as Staci
 Edie Mirman as the Big Boss Baby, Boss Baby's boss.
 James McGrath and Joseph Izzo as Elvis impersonators
 Chris Miller as Captain Ross

Production
Upon reading the original book on which the film is based McGrath felt a connection to it, as he had an older brother and felt like "the boss baby of the family". In keeping with that theme he stated, in an interview with Den of Geek, that "My personal goal with this was to watch this movie with my brother, and to see how it affected him!", which resulted in McGrath's brother being moved to tears by the completed film.

The look of the film was inspired by design techniques popularized in the 1960s, as well as animated films from both the 1950s and 1960s. This was due to McGrath's belief that contemporary animated films focused too much on realism. To help his staff McGrath would play the opening scene of Lady and the Tramp (1955) for new hires specifically noting that the film "should be easy on the eyes and really lead your eye to what’s important in the shot.

In September 2014, Alec Baldwin and Kevin Spacey joined the cast of the film, with further casting news announced in June 2016, including Steve Buscemi replacing Spacey.

Miles Bakshi, son of the DreamWorks Animation's producer Gina Shay and grandson of the film director Ralph Bakshi, best known for directing the 1972 American adult animated comedy film Fritz the Cat, provided the voice of 7-year old Tim. Having been often present at DreamWorks, McGrath initially asked Bakshi only to provide a temporary voice for Tim to see if the character "worked". The producers listened to 30 to 40 children to choose the scratch voice. McGrath explained their decision: "No one sounded as authentic as Miles did. A lot of child actors are great, but they are over-articulate for their age. Miles was just natural and charming. He had a little slur to his voice at the time and it was very endearing." Three years later, Miles was told that he got the part. Bakshi was 10 when he began recording the voice. During the long process, his voice started to change and "by the end it got pretty tough", according to Bakshi, who was 14 when the film was released. He had to get his voice "very soft, but when I got that perfect tone it was great."

Music
The film was scored by Hans Zimmer and Steve Mazzaro, Jacob Collier, and various artists. It marks as Zimmer's fifth collaboration with Tom McGrath after the Madagascar trilogy (2005–2012) and Megamind (2010), and his 12th overall film he that scored for DreamWorks Animation, which includes The Prince of Egypt (1998), The Road to El Dorado (2000), Spirit: Stallion of the Cimarron (2002), Shark Tale (2004), and the first three Kung Fu Panda films (2008–2016). The film's soundtrack was released on Back Lot Music & iTunes. "Blackbird" by The Beatles is used as part of the plot at various points throughout the film. During the end credits, Missi Hale recorded a cover of the Burt Bacharach song "What the World Needs Now Is Love" (first performed by Jackie DeShannon). "My House" by Flo Rida is also used in the trailer for the film.

Release

Theatrical
The Boss Baby was initially scheduled for release on March 18, 2016, but was later pushed back to March 31, 2017. The film premiered at the Miami Film Festival on March 12, 2017, and was released in the United States on March 31, 2017, by 20th Century Fox. The film was later released in Japan on March 21, 2018 by DreamWorks Animation's sister company Universal Pictures. The Japanese release is accompanied by the DreamWorks animated short Bird Karma.

Home media
20th Century Fox Home Entertainment released The Boss Baby for digital download on July 4, 2017, and on DVD, Blu-ray, Blu-ray 3D, and Ultra HD Blu-ray on July 25. Physical copies contain a short film, The Boss Baby and Tim's Treasure Hunt Through Time. From November 2017 to May 2019, the film is available on Netflix, the film is expected to return to the streaming platform after 4 years on May 22, 2023.

Reception

Box office
The Boss Baby grossed $175 million in the United States and Canada and $353 million in other territories, for a worldwide total of $528 million.

The film was released with Ghost in the Shell and The Zookeeper's Wife on March 31, 2017. The Boss Baby grossed $15.5 million on its first day, including $1.5 million from Thursday night previews. The film then earned $50 million from 3,773 theaters during its opening weekend. Its second weekend earnings dropped by 47% to $26.3 million, and followed by another $15.9 million the third weekend. The Boss Baby completed its theatrical run in the United States and Canada on November 2, 2017.

Critical response
Its critical consensus reads, "The Boss Babys talented cast, glimmers of wit, and flashes of visual inventiveness can't make up for a thin premise and a disappointing willingness to settle for doody jokes." Metacritic (which uses a weighted average) assigned The Boss Baby a score of 50 out of 100 based on 32 critics, indicating "mixed or average reviews". Audiences polled by CinemaScore gave the film an average grade of "A−" on an A+ to F scale.

Neil Genzlinger of The New York Times praised Baldwin and the adult humor, saying: "The contrast between the helpless-infant stage of life and corporate-speak is funny but fairly high-concept for a kiddie movie, and the plot grows denser as it goes along and the baby and Tim reluctantly join forces to stop a conspiracy by which puppies would corner all the love in the world."

Accolades

Academic Scholarship 
In 2021, interest in the original film was renewed when a philosophical symposium dedicated to the film was announced. While widely believed to be a prank at first, organizers Jaime McCaffrey and Tore Levander insisted this was not that case. Responding to the early criticism, McCaffrey stated to The A. V. Club that “Its messaging, the way that it tries to convey ideas, you almost can’t discern what the position of the movie is. And all the artistic decisions in the movie seem to be conflict with each other in such a way that as a viewer you are like ‘I don’t know what I’m supposed to feel and therefore I must analyze.’”

The first conference was done virtually and featured speakers from Northeastern University, Middlesex University, the University of York, Cambridge University, and a medical doctor from the University of California Riverside. JP Karliak, the TV show's voice actor, and Brandon Sawyer, writer and executive producer of The Boss Baby: Back in Business, both spoke at the event. The "Second First Annual" conference was hosted in January of 2023.

Franchise

Sequel

On May 25, 2017, Universal Pictures and DreamWorks Animation announced a sequel, which was released on July 2, 2021, with Alec Baldwin reprising his role. On May 17, 2019, it was announced that Tom McGrath will return as director and Jeff Hermann, who produced Bilby, Bird Karma, and Marooned, will produce the sequel. Hans Zimmer and Steve Mazzaro returned to write the music for the film.

Television series

On December 12, 2017, both Netflix and DreamWorks Animation announced the release of the TV series based on the film. The Boss Baby: Back in Business was released in 2018.

References

External links

 
 The Boss Baby at Fox Movies
 
 

2017 3D films
2017 computer-animated films
2010s American animated films
2010s children's comedy films
2010s spy comedy films
20th Century Fox animated films
20th Century Fox films
American 3D films
American adventure comedy films
American business films
American children's animated comedy films
American computer-animated films
American spy comedy films
Animated films about families
DreamWorks Animation animated films
Films scored by Hans Zimmer
Films adapted into television shows
Films based on children's books
Films directed by Tom McGrath
Films with screenplays by Michael McCullers
3D animated films
2017 comedy films
The Boss Baby (franchise)
Films about babies
Films set in 1987
Films set in 2017
2010s English-language films
Animated films about brothers
Animated films about revenge